Grochowiska may refer any of the following villages in Poland:

Grochowiska, Lower Silesian Voivodeship (south-west Poland)
Grochowiska, Kuyavian-Pomeranian Voivodeship (north-central Poland)
Grochowiska, Świętokrzyskie Voivodeship (south-central Poland), site of the Battle of Grochowiska in 1863
Grochowiska, Greater Poland Voivodeship (west-central Poland)
Grochowiska, West Pomeranian Voivodeship (north-west Poland)